Ebrahim Azhang (Persian: ابراهیم آژنگ, also transliterated as Ebrahim Ajang) was a composer from Iran of Iranian classical dastgah music during the Qajar period.

Life

He was a student of the French composer Alfred Jean Baptiste Lemaire and a colleague of Darvish Khan. He primarily played the violin. He composed many Pishdaramads and Rengs which are still popular among classical Iranian musicians. He taught at the Dar ul-Funun school.

References

 Nasiri Far, Men of Music 64/3-65
 Iranian music history, published by Simorgh, Hasan Mashhoun
 Musical and traditional men of Iran, Rad Publishing, Habibullah Nasiri
 Identification of Iranian music, Bina publication, Aziz Shabani
 Behrouz Shapouri, the faces of Iranian music vol.1

Iranian composers
Year of birth missing
Year of death missing

fa:ابراهیم آژنگ